Joseph Crook Dawson (July 17, 1889 - June 17, 1946) was an American race car driver.

Biography
He was born in Odon, Indiana on July 17, 1889. Dawson competed in the Indianapolis 500 race three times, beginning in 1911 when he drove a Marmon to a fifth-place finish. The following year, Dawson won after Ralph DePalma, who had led for 196 laps of the 200 lap race, dropped out with a mechanical failure. At age 22 years and 323 days, Dawson was the youngest winner of the "500" until Troy Ruttman won the 1952 Indianapolis 500 at age 22 years and 86 days. In his final Indy 500 race in 1914, Dawson retired after an accident on the 45th lap when avoiding Ray Gilhooley.

He died on June 17, 1946 at age 56 in Bensalem, Pennsylvania.

Indy 500 results

References

External links

 Profile on Historic Racing

1889 births
1946 deaths
Indianapolis 500 drivers
Indianapolis 500 winners
People from Daviess County, Indiana
Racing drivers from Indiana
Racing drivers from Pennsylvania